The following is a list of prime ministers of the Netherlands by religious affiliations.

Religious affiliations of prime ministers of the Netherlands

See also
 Prime Minister of the Netherlands
 List of prime ministers of the Netherlands
 Historical rankings of prime ministers of the Netherlands
 List of prime ministers of the Netherlands by education
 Religious affiliations of chancellors of Germany
 Religious affiliations of presidents of the United States
 List of prime ministers of Canada by religious affiliation

Netherlands